"Dancing in the Moonlight" is a song written by Sherman Kelly, originally recorded in 1970 by Kelly's band Boffalongo, and then a hit single by King Harvest in 1972, reaching number 5 in Canada and number 13 on the Billboard Hot 100. In 2000, a cover by English band Toploader became a worldwide hit and achieved multi-platinum status in the United Kingdom. A version by Swedish EDM duo Jubël, released in 2018, was a hit in Europe.

History 
Sherman Kelly wrote the song in 1969. While recovering from a vicious assault by a gang, he "envisioned an alternate reality, the dream of a peaceful and joyful celebration of life." Kelly wrote:

On a trip to St. Croix in 1969, I was the first victim of a vicious St. Croix gang who eventually murdered 8 American tourists. At that time, I suffered multiple facial fractures and wounds and was left for dead. While I was recovering, I wrote "Dancin in the Moonlight" in which I envisioned an alternate reality, the dream of a peaceful and joyful celebration of life. The song became a huge hit and was recorded by many musicians worldwide. "Dancin In The Moonlight" continues to be popular to this day.

He recorded it singing lead with his band Boffalongo, who were active from 1968 to 1971; they included it on their album Beyond Your Head, it was their final single. The song was also recorded by High Broom and released in 1970 on Island Records. It failed to reach the UK Singles Chart.

King Harvest version 

Sherman Kelly's brother Wells Kelly introduced the song to the Paris-based band King Harvest in which he was drummer, and former Boffalongo member Dave "Doc" Robinson was lead vocalist, bassist, and keyboardist. King Harvest recorded and released "Dancing in the Moonlight" as a single with "Lady, Come On Home" on the B-side in 1972. Steve Cutler, a jazz drummer from New York City (standing on the base of the pole in the cover picture), played drums on the tracks and toured France and the UK with the band. The group disbanded after six months and the single languished for a year until it was bought and released worldwide by Perception Records. In Canada, the song reached number 5 on the weekly charts and number 71 on the year-end chart for 1973.

Charts

Weekly charts

Year-end charts

Toploader version

In 2000, English band Toploader released a cover of "Dancing in the Moonlight". It was originally released on February 21, 2000, as the third single from their debut studio album, Onka's Big Moka (1999), and peaked at number 19 on the UK Singles Chart. It was then re-released in November of the same year with new production from Stargate and reached number seven on the same chart. The song has been certified 4× Platinum by the British Phonographic Industry (BPI) for sales and streams of over 2,400,000 units. Worldwide, the song reached the top 20 in Australia, Germany, Ireland, the Netherlands, Norway, and Spain.

Track listing
UK CD single reissue
 "Dancing in the Moonlight" – 3:52
 "Dancing in the Moonlight" (Stargate Radio Mix) – 3:30
 "Dancing in the Moonlight" (Alliance DC Vocal Remix) – 6:30
 "Dancing in the Moonlight" (Live) – 4:31

Charts

Weekly charts

Year-end charts

Certifications

Release history

Jubël version

Swedish record producer duo Jubël released a dance cover in 2018 featuring Neimy. It peaked at number 9 on Sverigetopplistan, the official Swedish Singles Chart. It also charted in Belgium's Ultratip Bubbling Under chart in both Flanders and Wallon francophone markets.

The song garnered the attention of British radio DJs in 2020 and as a result the Jubël version gained more popularity two years after its initial release in Sweden. The song was rereleased for the British market giving it a much bigger international audience. It peaked at number 11 on the UK Singles Chart, and the Irish and Scottish singles charts as well. The song was used in series 6 of the reality show Love Island in 2020 and spread to TikTok, while reaching the top of the British radio list. The song also charted on the ARIA Australian Official Singles Chart, also in 2020.

Releases
2018: "Dancing in the Moonlight" (2:44)
2019: "Dancing in the Moonlight" (PBH & Jack Sunset Remix Radio Edit) (2:16)	
2019: "Dancing in the Moonlight" (Jack Wins Remix) (2:40)	
2020: "Dancing in the Moonlight" (Nathan Dawe Remix) (2:51)

Charts

Certifications

Other versions
In 1994, a version by Bahamian group the Baha Men reached No. 18 in New Zealand and No. 42 in Canada.

In 2009 American actress/singer Alyson Stoner covered the song. Scenes from the film Space Buddies appear in the music video for this version; the music video is a special feature on the DVD release of the film.

In 2021, a cover of the song was featured during the end credits of Muppets Haunted Mansion, performed by the Muppet band Dr. Teeth and the Electric Mayhem.

See also
 List of 1970s one-hit wonders in the United States

References

1970 songs
1970 singles
1972 singles
1994 singles
2000 singles
2018 singles
King Harvest songs
Toploader songs
Baha Men songs
Liza Minnelli songs
Songs about dancing
A&M Records singles
Epic Records singles
S2 Records singles
United Artists Records singles
1970s ballads